Körner und Köter is a German television series.

See also
List of German television series

External links
 

2002 German television series debuts
2003 German television series endings
Television shows about dogs
German-language television shows
Sat.1 original programming